The Jordan Range is a mountain range in southeastern British Columbia, Canada, located northwest of Revelstoke, between the Columbia River and the Perry River, to the north of Three Valley Gap (the summit of Eagle Pass). It has an area of 634 km2 and is a subrange of the Monashee Mountains which in turn form part of the Columbia Mountains.

See also
List of mountain ranges

References

Monashee Mountains
Columbia Country